Western is an 'L' station on the CTA's Brown Line. It is an elevated station with two side platforms, located in the Lincoln Square neighborhood. Between Western and Rockwell the line descends and runs on ground level tracks for the rest of the route to Kimball.

History

The station was put into service in 1907 as part of Northwestern Elevated Railroad's Ravenswood line, and has been rebuilt twice since—in the late 1920s, and again from 1979 to 1981. The current station consists of two side platforms, and a central storage line, its platforms were extended in 2006–07 to enable the station to accommodate eight railcars.

Chicago's Berlin Wall Monument is located inside of the station. Chicago was offered a piece of the wall in 2008 by the German government. The city chose to place the monument in the historically German-American Lincoln Square neighborhood. It is dedicated to the citizens of Chicago for helping "secure the freedom" of Berlin.

Bus connections
CTA
  11 Lincoln 
  49 Western (Owl Service) 
  49B North Western 
  X49 Western Express (Weekday Rush Hours only)

Notes and references

Notes

References

External links 

 Western station on the CTA website
 Western station on chicago-l.org
 Western Avenue entrance from Google Maps Street View

CTA Brown Line stations
Railway stations in the United States opened in 1907
1907 establishments in Illinois